Robert Frederick Froehlke (October 15, 1922 – February 12, 2016) was an American businessman, lawyer, and government official who served as Secretary of the Army from July 1971 until May 1973.

Early life
Froehlke was born in Neenah, Wisconsin on October 15, 1922. He graduated from high school in Marshfield, and attended the University of Wisconsin from 1940 to 1943.  He joined the United States Army in 1943 serving at an Infantry Replacement Center in Europe, attaining the rank of captain before being discharged in 1946.

Education
After the war Froehlke attended the University of Wisconsin Law School. He graduated in 1949, was admitted to the bar, and practiced in Madison, Wisconsin with the firm of MacDonald and MacDonald. He also served as a member of the faculty at the University of Wisconsin Law School.

Career
In 1951, Froehlke joined the legal department of the Sentry Insurance Company and he later became an executive with the company. A longtime friend of Melvin R. Laird, he managed Laird's congressional campaigns. When Laird became Secretary of Defense, Froehlke was appointed Assistant Secretary of Defense for Administration. He served until 1971 and during his tenure he was assigned responsibility for all Department of Defense intelligence resources and he was chairman of the Defense Investigative Review Council.

Secretary of the Army
Froehlke became Secretary of the Army in July 1971 and served until May 1973. Under his administration, the Army redeployed its last troops from Vietnam and converted from the draft to an all-volunteer force. In addition, Army administration of the Ryukyu Islands was ended, and U.S. biological warfare facilities were closed in order to comply with international treaties and conventions.

As Secretary of the Army, Froehlke also was responsible for the action changing from dishonorable to honorable the discharges of the African-American soldiers who had been falsely accused of crimes in the 1906 Brownsville Affair.

Later career
After resigning as Secretary of the Army, Froehlke returned to Sentry, serving as the company's president until 1976 when he left to become president of the Health Insurance Association of America. He then became president of the American Council of Life Insurers where he served until 1982, when he became chairman of the Equitable Life Assurance Society of the United States where he served until 1987 when he became president and chief executive officer of the IDS Mutual Fund Group.

After his 1993 retirement Froehlke resided in Minneapolis, where he was active in raising funds for civic and charitable causes. He and then University of Wisconsin, Madison chancellor Donna Shalala co-chaired that school's first major fund drive. He maintained a summer home in Waupaca, Wisconsin after relocating to Scottsdale, Arizona. Froehlke died in Scottsdale, Arizona on February 12, 2016. Froehlke was buried at Arlington National Cemetery.

References

External links

1922 births
2016 deaths
Lawyers from Madison, Wisconsin
People from Marshfield, Wisconsin
Politicians from Neenah, Wisconsin
People from Waupaca, Wisconsin
Lawyers from Minneapolis
Politicians from Scottsdale, Arizona
University of Wisconsin–Madison alumni
University of Wisconsin Law School alumni
University of Wisconsin Law School faculty
Nixon administration personnel
United States Secretaries of the Army
Businesspeople from Madison, Wisconsin
Wisconsin lawyers
American businesspeople in insurance
Wisconsin Republicans
United States Army personnel of World War II
Military personnel from Madison, Wisconsin
United States Army officers
Businesspeople from Minneapolis
Burials at Arlington National Cemetery